Cha Woo-chan (born May 31, 1987) is a South Korean professional baseball pitcher currently playing for the LG Twins of KBO League.

He played for Samsung until the 2016 season and moved to Samsung on December 14, 2016, signing a free agent contract on the condition of 9.5 billion won in total four years. The team explained that he had recruited him to set the stage for future championship challenges.

Relationship 
In May 2017, it was revealed that he is in a relationship with top model and TV personality Han Hye-jin. However, it was announced that the two broke up after six months of dating.

References

External links
Career statistics and player information from Korea Baseball Organization

1987 births
2013 World Baseball Classic players
2015 WBSC Premier12 players
2017 World Baseball Classic players
Asian Games medalists in baseball
Baseball players at the 2014 Asian Games
KBO League pitchers
Living people
People from Gunsan
Samsung Lions players
South Korean baseball players
Medalists at the 2014 Asian Games
Asian Games gold medalists for South Korea
Baseball players at the 2020 Summer Olympics
Olympic baseball players of South Korea
Sportspeople from North Jeolla Province